The Philippine International Tennis Tournament was a men's tennis tournament played in Manila, Philippines from 1973-1978.  The event was part of the Grand Prix tennis circuit and was played on outdoor hard courts.

Finals

Singles

Doubles

References
 ATP archive
 ITF archive

Grand Prix tennis circuit
Sports in Manila
Tennis in the Philippines
Tennis tournaments in the Philippines
Hard court tennis tournaments